Oluseyi Ajirotutu (born June 12, 1987) is a former American football wide receiver and special teamer. He was signed by the San Diego Chargers as an undrafted free agent in 2010. He played college football at Fresno State. He is of Nigerian origin.

Ajirotutu has also played for the Carolina Panthers and Philadelphia Eagles.

Early years
Ajirotutu attended Oak Ridge High School in El Dorado Hills, California from 2001 to 2005. As a junior, Ajirotutu was selected to the First-Team All-League as a defensive back after making 70 tackles and picking off five passes. As a senior during the 2004-2005 season, he caught 77 passes for 1,205 yards and 17 touchdowns, leading all divisions in the Sac-Joaquin section. Ajirotutu had a monster game in the section championship against Del Oro with six receptions for 194 yards and three touchdowns, and at safety he made 15 tackles, eight of them solo. At season's end, he was selected as the Most Valuable Player on the Sacramento Bee All-Metro team after leading Oak Ridge to the Sac-Joaquin Section Division II championship. Additionally, Ajirotutu was selected as the Sierra Conference co-Defensive Player of the Year after tallying 95 tackles, five interceptions and a blocked punt. Ajirotutu was a two-year varsity letter winner and was selected to both the Cal-Hi Sports second-team all-state and the first-team All-NorCal.

College career
In 2005, he redshirted as a freshman. In 2009, he was selected Second Team All-Western Athletic Conference as voted on by the WAC head coaches. Ajirotutu led the Bulldogs with 48 receptions for 671 yards and seven touchdowns.

Professional career

San Diego Chargers (2010)
Ajirotutu was not selected in the 2010 NFL Draft but joined the team shortly after as an undrafted free agent. Ajirotutu received playing time due to the many injuries. He had a breakout game during week 9 on November 7, 2010 when he caught 4 catches for 111 yards and two touchdowns in the Chargers win over the Houston Texans. He ended the season with 13 catches for 262 yards and two touchdowns, and he was waived on September 3, 2011.

Carolina Panthers (2011)
On September 4, 2011, he was claimed off waivers by the Carolina Panthers.

On August 31, 2012, the day directly following their final preseason game in 2012, he was cut by the Panthers.

San Diego Chargers (2012−2014)
On October 29, 2012, Ajirotutu was again signed by the Chargers after Richard Goodman was put on injured reserve for the remainder of the season. Ajirotutu would later be placed on injured reserve for the remainder of the 2012 season.

On August 16, 2013, Ajirotutu was re-signed by the San Diego Chargers. On November 24, he caught a game-winning touchdown pass with 24 seconds left on the clock against the Kansas City Chiefs.

In 2014, he was voted by his teammates as the Chargers' Special Teams Player of the Year

Philadelphia Eagles (2015)
On April 7, 2015, the Philadelphia Eagles signed Ajirotutu to a one-year deal.

Career Statistics

Personal life
Seyi has been married to Autumn Ajirotutu since 2012, who appeared on the E! reality show WAGS for 3 seasons. They are the parents to twin girls Londyn and Laiyah. The couple divorced in 2020 and it was finalized in 2021. His father, Leke, was born in Nigeria.

References

External links
Fresno State Bulldogs football bio
San Diego Chargers bio
cbssports.com

1987 births
Living people
American football wide receivers
Fresno State Bulldogs football players
San Diego Chargers players
Sportspeople from Greater Sacramento
Carolina Panthers players
Philadelphia Eagles players
Players of American football from California
People from El Dorado Hills, California
American sportspeople of Nigerian descent